Saint Vitalis of Gaza (died ) was a hermit venerated as a saint in the Oriental Orthodox Church, Eastern Orthodox Church and the Catholic Church. He is the patron saint of prostitutes and day-laborers.

Life 

A monk of Gaza, Vitalis travelled to the city of Alexandria at the age of sixty. His legend states that after obtaining the name and address of every prostitute in the city, he hired himself out as a day laborer, and took his wage to one of these women at the end of the day. He would hire the woman for the night and, according to legend, spend the night praying for them or preaching to them.

This practice was condoned by the Church, and many prostitutes in the city abandoned their profession and became wives and mothers.

Death and veneration 
Vitalis was killed when a man, misunderstanding the nature of the monk's visit to a brothel, struck him on the head. Vitalis managed to return to his hut where he died. Apparently during his burial, former prostitutes came out to explain his works before processing with candles and lanterns as his body was brought to the grave.

In Eastern Churches, his feast days are on January 11 and April 22, while the Catholic Church only celebrates his feast on January 11.

References

External links
Venerable Vitalius of Gaza

625 deaths
7th-century Christian saints
Egyptian hermits
People from Gaza City
Saints from the Holy Land
Year of birth unknown
Egyptian Christian saints
Anti-prostitution activists